Dénes is a Hungarian male given name, the equivalent of Denis in English and can sometimes stand for or replace the feminine version of Den(n)is, namely Denise. As with many given names, it also transitioned into a surname in the Middle Ages. Notable people with the name include:

 Dénes Andrássy (1835-1913), Hungarian nobleman
 Dénes Berinkey (1871-1944), a Hungarian prime minister
 Dénes Birkás (1907–1996 ), Hungarian field hockey player 1936 Olympics
 Dénes Dibusz (b. 1990), Hungarian football player
 Dénes Farkas (1884–1973), Hungarian nobleman landowner, politician, member of the Hungarian Parliament 
 Dénes Gábor (1900-1979), Hungarian-British Nobel Prize laureate physicist and engineer
 Dénes Gulyás (b. 1954), Hungarian tenor
 Dénes Györgyi (1886-1961), Hungarian architect
 Dénes Kemény (b. 1954), Hungarian water polo player
 Dénes Kőnig (1884-1944), Jewish Hungarian mathematician
 Dénes Lukács (colonel) (1816-1868), Hungarian artillery commander in 1848 Revolution
 Dénes Mihály (1894-1953), Hungarian inventor
 Dénes Pataky (1916-1986), Hungarian figure skater
 Dénes Pázmándy (1781–1854) (1781–1854), Hungarian landowner and politician
 Dénes Rósa (b. 1977), Hungarian footballer
 Dénes Szakály (b. 1988), Hungarian football player

Hungarian masculine given names